A chain weapon is a weapon made of one or more heavy objects attached to a chain, sometimes with a handle. The flail was one of the more common types of chain weapons associated with medieval Europe, although some flails used hinges instead of chains.

In Japan
Various chain weapons were used in feudal Japan. Recognised fighting arts with such weapons include gekigan-jutsu (using a ball and chain), chigiriki-jutsu (using a ball and chain on a short stick), and kusarigama-jutsu (employing a chain-ball-sickle weapon). Ninja were expert at handling kusarigama, the composite sickle and chain with a ball being small enough to be easily concealed, and which was used to haul an enemy close enough to be dispatched by a thrust or slash of the razor-sharp kama. The shoge was a ring with a sickle-like knife on a chain that could be used to pierce armor, grapple, and to entangle the legs of man and horse. The chigiriki was a staff with a weighted chain on the end. The manriki-gusari was a double weighted chain. The nunchaku was a short chain with two short wooden sticks on the ends, although it was principally a farming tool rather than a weapon, at least until much later.

Gallery

See also
Bolas
Chainlock
Chain whip
Flail (weapon)
Kusari-fundo
List of mêlée weapons 
Meteor hammer
Rope dart (loosely speaking)
Slungshot (not to be confused with slingshot)
Surujin
Tabak-Toyok
Three section staff

References

Flexible weapons
Chains